David Alan Walker  (18 August 1928 – 12 February 2012) was a British scientist and professor of photosynthesis in the Department of Animal and Plant Sciences (APS) at the University of Sheffield. He authored over 200 scientific publications including several books during his lifetime.

Education
Walker was born in Hull and attended South Shields Boys' High School from 1939 to 1946. After doing his national service in the Royal Naval Air Service, he studied at King's College, Newcastle, then part of the Durham University, where he received his Bachelor of Science and subsequently his PhD for research supervised by Meirion Thomas.

Career and research
Walker's research interests were in photosynthesis, specifically he:

Awards and honours
Walker was elected a Fellow of the Royal Society (FRS) in 1976. His nomination reads: 

In 2004, Walker received the International Society of Photosynthesis Research Communications Award "to acknowledge his outstanding efforts to communicate photosynthesis to the general public." Walker was also awarded a Doctor of Science degree from Newcastle University in recognition of his exceptional contributions of published work in his field.

References

1928 births
2012 deaths
British botanists
Academics of the University of Sheffield
Scientists from Kingston upon Hull
Fellows of the Royal Society
Alumni of King's College, Newcastle